D′Iberville was a French Navy , designed to operate from French colonies in Asia and Africa. She was launched on 23 September 1934.

After France surrendered to Germany in June 1940 during World War II, D′Iberville served with the navy of Vichy France. She was scuttled with other ships of the French fleet at Toulon, France, on 27 November 1942.

Notes

Sources

 

 

1934 ships
Bougainville-class avisos
Ships built in France
World War II warships scuttled at Toulon
Maritime incidents in November 1942